The JAC V7 is a mid-sized pickup truck produced by JAC Motors for the Chinese market.

Overview

The JAC V7 pickup was launched in the Chinese market in 2018, with prices ranging from 71,800 yuan to 83,800 yuan as of 2020.

The engine options of the JAC V7 includes a 2.0 liter gasoline engine and a 2.0 liter diesel engine. The styling of the JAC V7 pickup is controversial as the front end design heavily resembles the Toyota Hilux.

References

External links
Official JAC website 

V7
Trucks of China
Pickup trucks
Rear-wheel-drive vehicles